Dōmyō-ji (道明寺) is a Buddhist temple and nunnery in Fujiidera, Osaka, Osaka Prefecture, Japan. It was founded in the sixth century, and is affiliated with Shingon Buddhism.

See also 
Historical Sites of Prince Shōtoku
List of National Treasures of Japan (sculptures)

External links 

Official website

Buddhist temples in Osaka Prefecture